The Third Philippine Legislature was the meeting of the legislature of the Philippines under the sovereign control of the United States from October 16, 1912, to February 24, 1916.

Sessions
First Regular Session: October 16, 1912– February 3, 1913
First Special Session: February 6 – 11, 1913
Second Regular Session: October 16, 1913 – February 3, 1914
Second Special Session: February 4 – 28, 1914
Third Regular Session: October 16, 1914 – February 5, 1915
Fourth Regular Session: October 16, 1915 – February 4, 1916
Second Special Session: February 14 – 24, 1916

Legislation
The Third Philippine Legislature passed a total of 473 laws (Act Nos. 2192–2664)

Leadership

Philippine Commission
Governor-General and ex-officio President of the Philippine Commission:
William Cameron Forbes 
Francis Burton Harrison appointed on September 2, 1913

Philippine Assembly
Speaker of the Philippine Assembly
Sergio Osmeña (Nacionalista, 2nd District Cebu)
Majority Floor Leader
Minority Floor Leader

Members

Philippine Commission

Sources:

 Journal of the Philippine Commission Being the First Session, October 16, 1912, to February 3, 1913, and A Special Session, February 6, 1913, to February 11, 1913, of the Third Philippine Legislature. Manila: Bureau of Printing. 1913.
 Journal of the Philippine Commission Being the Second Session, October 16, 1913, to February 3, 1914, and A Special Session, February 6, 1914, to February 28, 1914, of the Third Philippine Legislature. Manila: Bureau of Printing. 1914.
 Journal of the Philippine Commission Being the Third Session, October 16, 1914, to February 5, 1915, of the Third Philippine Legislature. Manila: Bureau of Printing. 1915.
 Journal of the Philippine Commission Being the Fourth Session, October 16, 1915, to February 4, 1916, and A Special Session, February 14, 1916, to February 24, 1916, of the Third Philippine Legislature. Manila: Bureau of Printing. 1916.

Philippine Assembly

Notes:

See also 
Congress of the Philippines
Senate of the Philippines
House of Representatives of the Philippines

References

External links

Further reading
Philippine House of Representatives Congressional Library

03